Ashagi Lamiya is an Indian artist, Indian television presenter, screenwriter, photographer and actress. She has anchored many interviews for Darshana TV (Business Star) She is also a known photographer who has won many awards.

Education

Lamiya was schooled at Mambaram English Medium School, Thalassery, Kerala. Being gifted in music, dance, photography, and drama as a child, Lamiya gave it a professional touch by acquiring a BS (Visual Communication) from Asan Memorial College of Arts & Science (UOM) and an MA (Mass Communication and Journalism) from Periyar University. It was during her days at Asan Memorial College of Arts & Science that she won the National Photography Competition Award on child labour and child begging conducted by the Kerala Region of the National Child Development Council and co-starred in the short film 'Together Forever' portraying uncommon envy in a relationship.

Works

She has done many short films as an actor too. In a very short span of time, Lamiya has worked on various assignments ranging from anchoring TV programmes, editing newspapers, writing and directing scripts and screenplays, interviewing business personalities, and contributing to the City Talk section of the weekly Oman Daily Observer. Her works are known for getting across the message with minimal words and actions.

Lamiya shares her concern regularly through journalism on global matters that include climate change arising from irresponsible management of natural resource, "...we’re consuming water faster than nature can replenish it."; and the disproportionate spread of wealth and unevenly distributed education setup, "...a general trend towards marked increases in tuition in recent years, even in countries where tuition fees have generally been much lower...", show her deep passion to change the much needed things around.

She has done a public service PowerPoint presentation on national patriotism and interviewed Mr. K. Mohanan Nair, Managing Director of Smrithi Ayurcar Ltd., Calicut, on the business challenges and evolution around Calicut over the years.

Some of Lamiya's works include as a script and screenplay writer and director 'Nashtapeta Kanuneer', 'Vengeance Demon', documentary on 'Tellicherry Fort' and screenplay & dialogues for Biodata, a short film which has over 1.6 lakhs views in YouTube.

References

1989 births
Living people
Indian women photographers
Indian women television presenters
Indian television presenters
Journalists from Kerala
People from Thalassery
Indian women television journalists
Indian television journalists
Television personalities from Kerala
21st-century Indian photographers
Photographers from Kerala
21st-century women photographers